The Cook-Morrow House is a historic house at 875 Main Street in Batesville, Arkansas.  It is a -story wood-frame structure, with a cross-gabled roof configuration and wooden shingle and brick veneer exterior.  A porch wraps around the front and right side.  The front-facing gable has a recessed arch section with a band of three sash windows in it.  Built in 1909, this Shingle style house was designed by John P. Kingston of Worcester, Massachusetts, and is one of Independence County's most architecturally sophisticated buildings.

The house was listed on the National Register of Historic Places in 1977.

See also
National Register of Historic Places listings in Independence County, Arkansas

References

Houses on the National Register of Historic Places in Arkansas
Shingle Style architecture in Arkansas
Houses completed in 1909
Houses in Batesville, Arkansas
National Register of Historic Places in Independence County, Arkansas
1909 establishments in Arkansas